The team jumping event, part of the equestrian program at the 2000 Summer Olympics was held on 28 September 2000 at the Sydney International Equestrian Centre 45 miles outside of Sydney, Australia. The results of the second and third round of the individual jumping were used to award rankings.  Like all other equestrian events, the competition was mixed gender, with both male and female athletes competing in the same division.  Fourteen teams, each consisting of four horse and rider pairs, entered the contest.

Medalists

Results

Round 1
Each team consisted of four pairs of horse and rider.  The penalty points of the lowest three pairs were added together to reach the team's penalty points.

Round 2
Each team consisted of four pairs of horse and rider.  The penalty points of the lowest three pairs were added together to reach the team's penalty points.

Bronze Medal Jump Off

Final standings

References

Source: Official Report of the 2000 Sydney Summer Olympics available at  https://web.archive.org/web/20060622162855/http://www.la84foundation.org/5va/reports_frmst.htm

Equestrian at the 2000 Summer Olympics